Moazzam Tufail Malik  is a former British civil servant and diplomat. He is Managing Director at the World Resources Institute, a leading international NGO and think tank focused on climate and development issues, and Chair at the Muslim Charities Forum, an umbrella NGO for faith based charities in the UK. He tweets @moazzamtmalik. 

Malik served as Director-General Africa in the UK Foreign, Commonwealth and Development Office from the date of its creation in September 2020. As well as overseeing the Embassy network across Africa, his thematic responsibilities included international finance, conflict, good governance and human rights, and the Commonwealth. Malik's resignation became public in March 2022 drawing wide coverage on the state of the merger between the Foreign Office and Department for International Development. He commented on the need to reform the UK's approach to international affairs on leaving the FCDO. 

Malik was previously Director-General for Country Programmes at the UK Department for International Development (October 2019 to September 2020). He was the United Kingdom Ambassador to Indonesia, ASEAN and Timor-Leste from October 2014 to July 2019.  

Malik is an Honorary Fellow at Hertford College, Oxford University and was appointed an Honorary Professor at University College London in February 2023. He was made a Companion of the Order of St Michael and St George (CMG) in the 2019 Birthday Honours.

Education
Malik has a BSc Honours in Economics from the London School of Economics. He holds a Master's degree from Oxford University, and a Chartered Diploma in Accounting and Finance from the ACCA. He studied at Whitmore High School and Lowlands Sixth Form College in Harrow.

Career
Prior to joining the Foreign and Commonwealth Office (FCO) in 2014, Malik held a number of senior positions at the Department for International Development (DFID). In 2013, he was Acting Director General in DFID, overseeing the UK's development relationship with international organisations such as the UN, World Bank, Asian Development Bank and IMF, and managing the UK's engagement in the Western Asia and the Middle East. 

From 2010 to 2013, he was DFID Director for Western Asia and Stabilisation leading a team of 300 people with a budget of US$750m working across Afghanistan, Pakistan, and Central Asia. Prior to that he was DFID Director for UN, Conflict and Humanitarian. He led work on the 2006 UK White Paper on international development, 'Making Governance Work for the Poor'. From 2003, he was Principal Private Secretary to Baroness Valerie Amos and then Hilary Benn MP, Secretary of State for International Development. He was closely involved in major humanitarian operations throughout this period, including the response to the 2004 Aceh tsunami and 2008 Burma cyclone. He has also handled DFID engagement in Iraq and on trade policy.

Malik was a member of the UN Secretary General's Advisory Group on the Central Emergency Revolving Fund as well as OECD DAC Peer Reviewer for Sweden. He was a trustee of an NGO eradicating child labour, Goodweave UK, and a member of the Advisory Board to the UK All-Party Parliamentary Group on Conflict.

Earlier in his career, Malik worked as a consultant economist for UK corporations and the World Bank; managed an engineering business; advised on  monetary and foreign exchange policy in the Bank of Uganda; and led an urban regeneration NGO focused on international trade in London. He was also a researcher at the London School of Economics and the Overseas Development Institute.

On his appointment as HM Ambassador to Indonesia, Malik expressed strong ambition for the UK partnership with a country that is "rapidly growing country at the heart of Asia's future". Malik learned Indonesian in London and Yogyakarta before taking up his assignment. On leaving Jakarta, he wrote a "farewell letter" published in the Indonesian newspaper Kompas that was very widely read in print and online. The English language paper The Jakarta Post published an editorial praising his farewell message.

Personal life
Malik was born and grew up in North West London. His father, Mohammed Amin Malik, migrated to Britain in the late 1950s from Pakistan in search of a better life. Malik is married to Rachel Malik and has three children. He is a Liverpool F.C. fan, plays tennis, and follows the Pakistani cricket team.

References

External links
 
 
 

Ambassadors of the United Kingdom to Indonesia
Alumni of the London School of Economics
Alumni of the University of Oxford
Civil servants from London
Living people
Year of birth missing (living people)
Companions of the Order of St Michael and St George